The 2022 Philippine House of Representatives elections were the 36th lower house elections in the Philippines. The election of the House of Representatives was held on May 9, 2022.

The election is held concurrently with the 2022 presidential, Senate and local elections. A voter has two votes in the House of Representatives: one for the congressional district, and one for party-list. Parties of leading presidential candidates are expected to stand candidates in many districts. In the outgoing 18th Congress, there are 243 congressional districts.

There are 253 congressional districts for this election, which means 63 seats, or at least 20% of the seats, disputed in the party-list election. The party-list election is done on a nationwide, at-large basis, separate and distinct from the election from the congressional districts.

Allies of presidential-elect Bongbong Marcos won a majority of the seats, with his cousin Martin Romualdez being elected as speaker.

Background 

In the 18th Congress of the Philippines, the parties supporting President Rodrigo Duterte disputed the speakership, Alan Peter Cayetano of the Nacionalista Party, Lord Allan Jay Velasco of PDP–Laban, and the National Unity Party's (NUP) Paolo Duterte emerged as the front-runners to be speaker. The president pushed for a term-sharing agreement between Cayetano and Velasco, with Cayetano serving from July 2019 to October 2020, then Velasco serving until 2022. The younger Duterte disapproved of term-sharing, though. Cayetano was elected Speaker in July 2019.

By March 2020, Cayetano allegedly met with representatives from the Nacionalistas and the NUP to consolidate support for his tenure as speaker. This allegedly involved declaring the position of Speaker vacant. and with Cayetano having enough votes to be reelected, override the original agreement in order to remain in position for the rest of the congressional term. Cayetano, when asked about this, said "I cannot predict what's going to happen sa (on the) floor which can happen anytime and any member can make any motion."

Weeks before he was expected to turn over the speakership to Velasco, Cayetano said that Velasco's term should have started in November, as October is the 15th month, and it was brokered that he become speaker for the first 15 months. Aside from the speakership, only one committee chairmanship is expected to change hands, with all other positions unaffected by the change.

In a September 29, 2020 meeting between President Duterte, Cayetano and Velasco, the president asked the representatives to abide by the gentleman's agreement. Velasco rejected Duterte's suggestion to move the term-sharing deal from October to December. On the October 1 session, Cayetano, who attacked Velasco for pushing through with the deal in the middle of the pandemic and while the budget was being tackled offered to resign as speaker, but it was rejected by his allies. A later vote showed that 184 representatives wanted Cayetano to stay as speaker, 1 dissented, and 9 abstained.

At the next week, Congress suspended its session a week earlier than scheduled. At the session Cayetano moved to terminate the period of debates and amendments. After that was approved, another motion was approved for the 2021 budget to be approved on second reading. The session was then suspended until November 16. This meant that session was suspended before the expected transfer of power on October 14. This put the status of the budget in time in doubt. Duterte called on Cayetano and Velasco to settle their differences or else he'll "do it for you". Duterte then called on a special session from October 13 to 16 to pass the budget.

On October 11, pictures of Velasco and Davao City mayor Sara Duterte appeared on the internet, with the presidential daughter giving tacit approval of Velasco's speakership campaign. On October 12, the day before the special session, Velasco and his allies gathered in the Celebrity Sports Plaza in Quezon City to elect new officials of the House of Representatives, including the speakership. Velasco was elected 186–0. Cayetano branded the session as illegal. On the morning of the special session, Velasco allies entered the session hall of the Batasang Pambansa Complex and elected Velasco as speaker in the same 186–0 result. While voting was ongoing, Cayetano resigned as speaker on Facebook live, giving Velasco the speakership undisputedly. Velasco then recalled the budget from second reading, reopening deliberations for it.

After Velasco and his allies consolidated leadership positions in the chamber, Cayetano and six of his allies launched "BTS sa Kongreso", or "Back to service in Congress" in January 2021. Cayetano clarified that his bloc was not named as such, in response to fans of South Korean boy band BTS who called out Cayetano using the name of the boy band for political motives.

Electoral system 
The Philippines uses parallel voting for its lower house elections. For this election, there shall be 316 seats in the House of Representatives; 253 of these are district representatives, and 63 are party-list representatives.

Philippine law mandates that there should be one party-list representative for every four district representatives. District representatives are elected under the first-past-the-post system from single-member districts. Party-list representatives are elected via the nationwide vote with a 2% election threshold, with a party winning not more than three seats. The party with the most votes usually wins three seats, then the other parties with more than 2% of the vote two seats. At this point, if all of the party-list seats are not filled up, the parties with less than 2% of the vote will win one seat each until all party-list seats are filled up. The electoral system, with the 2% threshold and the 3-seat cap, encourage vote splitting; several parties have indeed exploited this, putting up separate party-lists for every sector so as not to waste their vote on just one party.

Political parties competing in the party-list election are barred from participating district elections, and vice versa, unless permitted by the Commission on Elections. Party-lists and political parties participating in the district elections may forge coalition deals with one another.

Campaigning for elections from congressional districts seats are decidedly local; the candidates are most likely a part of an election slate that includes candidates for other positions in the locality, and slates may comprise different parties. The political parties contesting the election make no attempt to create a national campaign.

Party-list campaigning, on the other hand, is done on a national scale. Parties usually attempt to appeal to a specific demographic. Polling is usually conducted for the party-list election, while pollsters may release polls on specific district races. In district elections, pollsters do not attempt to make forecasts on how many votes a party would achieve, nor the number of seats a party would win; they do attempt to do that in party-list elections, though.

Redistricting 
In the Philippines, Congress has the power to create new congressional districts. Congress can either redistrict the entire country within three years after each Philippine census, or create new districts from existing ones piecemeal, although Congress has never redistricted the entire country wholesale since the approval of the 1987 constitution. Congress usually creates a new district once a place reaches the minimum 250,000 population mandated by the constitution.

New districts can also be created by creating new provinces and cities; in this case, it also must be approved by the people in a plebiscite in the affected places.

Changes from 17th (previous) Congress 
There are four new districts that will be first contested in 2022, based from redistricting laws passed by the 17th Congress that were not implemented in time for the 2019 election:

Dividing Southern Leyte's at-large district to two districts
The part of Southern Leyte to the east of Sogod Bay belongs to the 1st district, while the 2nd district is the one to the west, including Sogod.
Enacted into law as Republic Act No. 11198
Dividing South Cotabato's 1st district to two districts
A new district will be created for General Santos, which becomes its own at-large district.
The rest of the 1st district, which are municipalities of South Cotabato, were left intact.
Enacted into law as Republic Act No. 11243
Dividing Cebu's 6th district to two districts
A new district will be created for Mandaue, which becomes its own at-large district
The rest of the district (Consolacion and Cordova) remains intact.
Enacted into law as Republic Act No. 11257
Dividing Palawan to three provinces
Taytay and all municipalities north of it would have been Palawan del Norte, municipalities in between Taytay and Puerto Princesa would have been Palawan Oriental, municipalities south of Puerto Princesa would have been Palawan del Sur, and Puerto Princesa itself would have become its own at-large district.
Enacted into law as Republic Act No.11259
Defeated in a plebiscite held on March 13, 2021.
Dividing Laguna's 1st district to two districts
A new district will be created for Santa Rosa, which becomes its own at-large district.
The rest of the 1st district, San Pedro, remains intact.
Enacted into law as Republic Act No. 11395

It will also be the first election for Davao de Oro in that name, after the successful renaming plebiscite in 2019 from "Compostela Valley".

In Palawan, a law was passed dividing it into three provinces, with each province and Puerto Princesa getting a new district each; Palawan and Puerto Princesa together presently has 3 districts. As this means creating new provinces, it had to be approved in a plebiscite before it can be made effective. In the ensuing plebiscite held on March 13, 2021, the voters rejected division, thereby retaining the status quo of three districts shared between Palawan and Puerto Princesa.

Changes from 18th (current) Congress 
There are six new districts created by the 18th Congress that have either been signed by President Rodrigo Duterte, or lapsed into law:

 Dividing Rizal's 2nd district to three districts
 This involves giving Rodriguez and San Mateo their own congressional districts each as 4th and 3rd districts respectively, while leaving the rest of the 2nd district intact.
Enacted into law as Republic Act No. 11533
Dividing Caloocan's 1st district to two districts
The new 3rd district shall include Camarin's Barangay 178, and the entirety of Tala and Amparo, while leaving the rest of the 1st district intact.
Enacted into law as Republic Act No. 11545
Reapportioning Bulacan excluding San Jose del Monte from four districts to six
This involves redistricting Bulacan's 2nd, 3rd and 4th districts. The 1st district was not affected.
Enacted into law as Republic Act No. 11546
Reapportioning Bataan from two districts to three
Bagac and Mariveles from the 2nd district and Dinalupihan and Morong from the 1st district will compose the new 3rd district, with the rest of the 1st and 2nd districts intact.
Enacted into law as Republic Act No. 11553
In August 2021, the Commission on Elections set the number of seats to be disputed in the election. As there were 253 districts by that date, that means there will be 63 party-list seats to be disputed as well.

A law was ratified dividing Maguindanao into two provinces; as Maguindanao now is divided into 2 districts, this does not change the number of districts, but does send Talitay along with the old 1st district to Maguindanao del Norte, while leaving the rest of the old 2nd district as the new Maguindanao del Sur. As this involved creating new provinces, the people must agree on a plebiscite for this to be effective. The law originally scheduled the plebiscite in August 2021, but the Commission on Elections rescheduled the plebiscite to be held after the 2022 election. This means that in Maguindanao, the current appropriation would be used before the province was to be divided.

As there shall be 253 districts in these elections, and that party-list seats shall also be 20% of the seats in the chamber, 63 seats are to be disputed under the party-list system. This means that the incoming 19th Congress will have 316 seats.

Participating parties 
In both chambers of Congress, members are organized into "blocs", akin to parliamentary groups elsewhere. In keeping with the traditions of the Third Philippine Republic which was under a two-party system, there are two main blocs, the majority and minority blocs; this is despite the fact that the country is now in a multi-party system. Those who voted for the winning speaker are from the majority bloc, while those who did not (if there are more than two candidates for the speakership) will vote amongst themselves on who will be the minority bloc. Those who belong to neither bloc shall be the independent minority bloc. Members can also be from the independent bloc. Each bloc can have members from multiple parties. Only the majority and minority blocs have voting privileges in committees.

In the present 18th Congress, the majority bloc is seen to be in favor of President Rodrigo Duterte's presidency, while the minority and independent minority blocs are those opposed.

Elections in congressional districts 
Political parties in the Philippines have been described as "temporary political alliances", or argued that there are no parties at all, just "fan clubs of politicians". Party-switching is not uncommon. The dependence of parties on personalities instead of issues is seen as a factor on why this is so.

Party-list election 
In party-list elections, parties, usually called as "party-lists" can represent ideological, sectoral or ethnolinguistic interests. These elections have allowed left-wing parties to enter the legislature, such as parties allied with the Makabayan and Akbayan, and right-wing parties such as Magdalo. Other parties represent sectoral interests such as Senior Citizens, who represent the elderly, or regionalists such as Ako Bikol who represent Bicolanos. While envisioned as a tool to allow the marginalized to enter the legislature, it has allowed politicians who had previously run and won in non-party-list elections and landed interests to win under the party-list banner as well. Party-list representatives have also run and won in elections outside the party-list system as well.

The Party-list Coalition has represented party-list interests in Congress starting in 2014. In the 18th Congress, all party-lists, save for those from Makabayan and Magdalo, are members of this group. The Party-list Coalition participate in the election as individual member parties; the component parties of the Makabayan are in coalition with each other. The party-list representatives, save from the Makabayan bloc usually support the policies of the sitting president.

Retiring and term-limited incumbents 

Representatives who have been elected for three consecutive times on regular elections (special elections do not count) are prohibited from running for a fourth consecutive term. Incumbents on their first or second terms may opt to run for other offices.

Term-limited incumbents 
These are incumbents who are on their third consecutive terms and cannot run for re-election but may run for other offices outside the House of Representatives. Term-limited politicians usually run for local offices or swap positions with relatives.

Notes

Retiring incumbents
These were allowed defend their seats, but chose not to:

Notes

Marginal seats

Elections in congressional districts 
These are the marginal seats that had a winning margin of 5% or less in the 2019 elections, in ascending order via margin:

Party-list elections 
The following party-lists won less than 2% of the vote in 2019, and only won one seat each because all of party-list seats have not been filled up by the parties that did win at least 2% of the vote. These are sorted by number of votes in descending order.

Less than 2% of the vote, but greater than or equal to 1%:
 Coalition of Association of Senior Citizens in the Philippines (Rodolfo Ordanes)
 Magkakasama sa Sakahan Kaunlaran (Argel Joseph Cabatbat)
 Association of Philippine Electric Cooperatives (Sergio Dagooc)
 Gabriela Women's Party (Arlene Brosas)
 An Waray (Florencio Gabriel Noel)
 Cooperative NATCCO Network Party (Sabiniano Canama)
 ACT Teachers (France Castro)
 Philippine Rural Electric Cooperatives Association (Presley De Jesus)
 Ako Bisaya (Sonny Lagon)
 Tingog Sinirangan (Yedda Marie Romualdez)
 Abono (Conrado Estrella III)
 Buhay Hayaan Yumabong (Lito Atienza)
 Duterte Youth (Ducielle Cardema)
 Kalinga-Advocacy for Social Empowerment and Nation Building Through Easing Poverty (Irene Gay Saulog)
 Puwersa ng Bayaning Atleta (Jericho Nograles)
 Alliance of Organizations Networks and Associations of the Philippines (Anna Marie Villaraza-Suarez)
 Rural Electric Consumers and Beneficiaries of Development and Advancement (Godofredo Guya)
 Bagong Henerasyon (Bernadette Herrera-Dy)
 Bahay para sa Pamilyang Pilipino (Naealla Rose Bainto-Aguinaldo)
 Construction Workers Solidarity (Romeo Momo Sr.)

Less than 1% of the vote:
 Abang Lingkod (Joseph Stephen Paduano)
 Advocacy for Teacher Empowerment Through Action, Cooperation and Harmony Towards Educational Reforms (Maria Victoria Umali)
 Barangay Health Wellness (Angelica Natasha Co)
 Social Amelioration and Genuine Intervention on Poverty (SAGIP) (Rodante Marcoleta)
 Trade Union Congress Party (Raymond Democrito Mendoza)
 Magdalo para sa Pilipino (Manuel Cabochan)
 Galing sa Puso Party (Jose Gay Padiernos)
 Manila Teachers Savings and Loan Association (Virgilio Lacson)
 Rebolusyonaryong Alyansa Makabansa (Aloysia Lim)
 Alagaan Natin Ating Kalusugan (Mike Defensor)
 Ako Padayon Pilipino (Adriano Ebcas)
 Ang Asosayon Sang Mangunguma Nga Bisaya-Owa Mangunguma (Sharon Garin)
 Kusug Tausug (Shernee Tan)
 Dumper Philippines Taxi Drivers Association (Claudine Diana Bautista)
 Talino at Galing ng Pinoy (Jose Teves Jr.)
 Public Safety Alliance for Transformation and Rule of Law (Jorge Antonio Bustos)
 Anak Mindanao (Amihilda Sangcopan)
 Agricultural Sector Alliance of the Philippines (Rico Geron)
 LPG Marketers Association (LPGMA) (Allan Ty)
 OFW Family Club (Bobby Pacquiao)
 Kabalikat ng Mamamayan (KABAYAN) (Ron Salo)
 Democratic Independent Workers Association (Michael Edgar Aglipay)
 Kabataan (Sarah Elago)

Results
Results in elections in congressional districts are expected to be known overnight, while results for the party-list election are expected to be known seven days from election day.

Allies of Bongbong Marcos, the  winner of the concurrent presidential election, captured most of the seats in the House of Representatives. Outgoing majority leader Martin Romualdez and former speaker Gloria Macapagal Arroyo are thought to be the contenders for the speakership in the 19th Congress.

Elections in congressional districts

Detailed results 

Notes

Party-list election 
A total of 177 parties and organizations were included in the draw on how these would be listed in the ballot.

The commission originally expected to proclaim the winners in seven days. A week after the election, the commission said it plans to proclaim the winners on May 19. Upon the proclamation of senators-elect on May 18, the commission said they'd proclaim the winning party-lists after the results of the special elections in 12 barangays in Tubaran, Lanao del Sur on May 24 are known. COMELEC did proclaim the winners on May 26.

Defeated incumbents

Elections in districts 
These include incumbents who ran and lost while running within a congressional district.

 Bulacan–1st: Jose Antonio Sy-Alvarado
 Catanduanes: Hector Sanchez
 Ilocos Norte–1st: Ria Christina Fariñas
 Ilocos Sur–1st: Deogracias Victor Savellano
 La Union–2nd: Sandra Eriguel
 Maguindanao–1st: Datu Roonie Sinsuat Sr.
 Manila–1st: Manny Lopez
 Manila–5th: Cristal Bagatsing
 Misamis Occidental–1st: Diego Ty
 Negros Occidental–5th: Maria Lourdes Arroyo
 Nueva Ecija–4th: Maricel Natividad-Nagaño
 Palawan–3rd: Gil Acosta
 Pangasinan–2nd: Jumel Anthony Espino
 Quezon–3rd: Aleta Suarez
 Quezon City–1st: Anthony Peter Crisologo
 Quezon City–2nd: Precious Hipolito
 Quezon City–3rd: Allan Benedict Reyes
 Quezon City–4th: Bong Suntay
 Samar–1st: Edgar Mary Sarmiento
 Surigao del Sur–1st: Prospero Pichay Jr.
 Zamboanga del Sur–2nd: Leonardo Babasa Jr.

Party-list election 
These includes incumbents who have not been elected in the party-list election, either because their party lost all seats, or lost enough seats, including the incumbent's own.

 A TEACHER: Maria Victoria Umali
 Ako Padayon Pilipino: Adriano Ebcas
 Anak Mindanao: Amihilda Sangcopan
 BAHAY: Naella Aguinaldo
 Bayan Muna:
 Ferdinand Gaite
 Carlos Isagani Zarate
 DIWA: Michael Edgar Aglipay
 Magdalo: Manuel Cabochan III
 OFW Family Club: Bobby Pacquiao
 RAM: Aloy Lim
 RECOBODA: Godofredo Guya

Aftermath 

With the victory of his cousin, Bongbong Marcos, as president, outgoing majority leader Martin Romualdez was pushed by the National Unity Party (NUP) to lead the House of Representatives. Another candidate is Gloria Macapagal Arroyo, who served as speaker during the 17th Congress, and endorsed Romualdez for speaker in the 18th. Another potential candidate is current speaker Lord Allan Velasco of the ruling PDP–Laban, while both Arroyo and Romualdez are from Lakas–CMD.

A few days after the NUP endorsement, Arroyo herself endorsed Romualdez for the speakership, advising the Lakas congressmen to vote for Romualdez in the speakership election. Following the Arroyo endorsement, PDP–Laban also endorsed Romualdez for the speakership. The Party-list Coalition also gave their endorsement to Romualdez, while announcing that Elizaldy Co, representative for Ako Bikol, will be their leader in the 19th Congress, replacing Mikee Romero of 1-PACMAN. Later in the week, Lakas released a statement that said that the Nationalist People's Coalition (NPC) also endorsed Romauldez's speakership ambitions, with NPC chairman Tito Sotto announcing in a separate statement the "unconditional support of the party to the Speakership of Congressman Martin Romualdez." A few days later, PDP–Laban announced its support for Romauldez's speakership.

References

2022 Philippine general election
Lower house elections in the Philippines
May 2022 events in the Philippines